Neville Gadsden (23 May 1919 – 17 January 1984) was an Australian athlete. He competed in the men's hammer throw at the 1956 Summer Olympics.

References

1919 births
1984 deaths
Athletes (track and field) at the 1956 Summer Olympics
Australian male hammer throwers
Olympic athletes of Australia
Athletes from Sydney